Álvaro Borja Morata Martín (born 23 October 1992) is a Spanish professional footballer who plays as a striker for La Liga club Atlético Madrid and the Spain national team.

He began his career at Real Madrid, making his debut with the senior team in late 2010. After winning the 2013–14 UEFA Champions League, he moved to Juventus for €20 million in 2014, winning the double of Serie A and the Coppa Italia in both of his seasons with the club. After being bought back by Real Madrid for €30 million, he won a La Liga title and the UEFA Champions League in 2016–17 before joining Premier League club Chelsea in 2017 for a club record fee of around £60 million. In January 2019, he moved to Atlético Madrid on loan and joined the club permanently on 1 July 2020. From 2020 to 2022, Morata had another spell at Juventus on loan, winning the Supercoppa Italiana before continuing at Atlético Madrid.

Morata earned 34 caps for Spain at youth level, helping his country win the 2013 UEFA European Under-21 Championship. He made his senior debut in 2014, and has represented Spain at UEFA Euro 2016, UEFA Euro 2020 and the 2022 FIFA World Cup.

Club career

Real Madrid
Morata signed for Real Madrid in 2008 from neighbouring Getafe after starting out at Atlético Madrid, and appeared for Real Madrid C while still a junior. In July 2010, after a successful season with the Juvenil A team, where he won two youth titles and scored 34 goals, he was promoted to Real Madrid Castilla, Real's reserve team. Later that month, first-team manager José Mourinho took Morata and four of his teammates on a preseason tour in the United States.

On 15 August 2010, Morata made his debut with Castilla in a friendly match with Alcorcón, scoring the only goal of the game. His Segunda División B debut came on 29 August in a 3–2 win against Coruxo, and he scored his first competitive goal in a 1–1 draw against Alcalá on 31 October.

On 12 December 2010, Morata made his debut for the first team when he was brought on as a substitute for Ángel Di María in the 88th minute of a 3–1 La Liga win at Real Zaragoza. Ten days later he made his first appearance in the Copa del Rey, again coming off the bench in the last few minutes. In January 2011, after Gonzalo Higuaín's injury, the Spanish media expected Morata to be his replacement in the main squad. Mourinho, however, rejected this, saying that "Morata is not yet ready to be a starter at Madrid. He trains with us, but he has to continue learning with Castilla". In this period Morata scored five goals in four matches with the reserves, while Emmanuel Adebayor was signed to replace Higuaín in the first team.

On 13 February 2011, Morata scored the first hat-trick of his career, in a 7–1 victory against Deportivo Fabril. He finished his first season as a senior with 14 league goals – joint top scorer in the squad with Joselu – but Castilla failed to gain promotion in the play-offs.

Morata scored his first competitive goal with Real's first team on 11 November 2012, coming on in the 83rd minute and scoring the winner after just 60 seconds in a 2–1 away win against Levante. In his first official start, at home against Rayo Vallecano on 17 February of the following year, he scored the opener after just three minutes, but was substituted before the half-hour mark to make room for Raúl Albiol, after Sergio Ramos was sent off in a 2–0 home victory.

On 2 March 2013, Morata played the full 90 minutes of El Clásico against Barcelona, assisting Karim Benzema to score the opener in an eventual 2–1 home win. In the following season, he became a regular member of the first-team squad under new coach Carlo Ancelotti, but expressed a desire for more minutes during the January transfer window.

On 18 March 2014, Morata scored his first goal in the UEFA Champions League, the third goal in a 3–1 win over Schalke 04 at the Santiago Bernabéu in the round of 16. On 17 May, in the last game of the league campaign, he scored two late goals against Espanyol to help Real to a 3–1 home win, and finish with eight goals in the competition. He also featured in the club's victory in the UEFA Champions League Final against Atlético Madrid, playing the last ten minutes of regular time and extra time after replacing Benzema.

Juventus

On 19 July 2014, Juventus announced that they had reached an agreement for the fee of €20 million for the transfer of Morata, who signed a five-year deal, with Real Madrid having the option to buy him back in the future. He made his debut in Serie A on 13 September, replacing Fernando Llorente for the final minute of a 2–0 home win against Udinese; two weeks later he again came on in place of his compatriot, and headed his first goal for his new club as they won 3–0 at Atalanta.

On 5 October 2014, in a 3–2 home win against Roma, Morata came on as a substitute and was sent off for a foul on Kostas Manolas, who was ordered off for retaliating. On 9 November he scored twice in a 7–0 home demolition of Parma, with Llorente – whom he replaced after 71 minutes – adding a further two. Morata came on for the final ten minutes of the Supercoppa Italiana against Napoli in Doha, Qatar on 22 December, and scored in the penalty shoot-out which Juventus lost 5–6.

On 28 January 2015, Morata played the last 13 minutes of the Coppa Italia fixture against Parma, and scored the game's only goal at the Stadio Ennio Tardini to qualify for the semi-finals. The following month, at home against Borussia Dortmund in the UEFA Champions League round of 16, he scored the winner in the 43rd minute of the first leg; he also started and found the net in the return match, helping Juve to a 3–0 win at the Westfalenstadion.

On 7 April 2015, Morata was sent off for a foul on Alessandro Diamanti as Juventus defeated Fiorentina in the cup semi-final, thus missing the final. One week later, he won a penalty in the first leg of the Champions League quarter-final against Monaco, which was converted by Arturo Vidal in a 1–0 home win. In the first leg of the semi-final, against Real Madrid, he put the hosts ahead with a tap-in in the eighth minute, as the match ended in a 2–1 home victory, and he repeated the feat in the return match, on both occasions not celebrating scoring against his former club. On 6 June, in the final against Barcelona in Berlin, he scored the equaliser early in the second half of a 1–3 loss.

In early August 2015, Morata was ruled out for a month due to a soleus muscle tear in his left calf during training, and was sidelined for the 2015 Supercoppa Italiana. In his second appearance after returning to action, on 15 September, he featured for 85 minutes and scored the winner in a 2–1 win at Manchester City in the UEFA Champions League group phase. On 30 September, he scored to help defeat Sevilla 2–0 at the Juventus Stadium, his fifth goal in as many appearances in the competition to equal Alessandro Del Piero's record. On 24 November, he was nominated for the UEFA Team of the Year.

On 10 December 2015, Morata signed a contract extension until 2020. On 20 March 2016, in the Derby della Mole away to neighbours Torino, he came off the bench in the first half and scored twice in a 4–1 victory. On 21 May, he again came off the bench to score the winning goal in the 20th minute of extra time to win the Coppa Italia final 1–0 against A.C. Milan in Rome's Stadio Olimpico.

Return to Real Madrid
On 21 June 2016, Real Madrid exercised their buy-back clause to re-sign Morata from Juventus for €30 million. His first competitive appearance was on 9 August, as he started in a 3–2 win over fellow Spaniards Sevilla in the 2016 UEFA Super Cup, being replaced by Benzema after 62 minutes. His first goal came in a 2–1 home win over Celta on 27 August.

On 5 April 2017, Morata profited from manager Zinedine Zidane's rotations and scored three times in a 4–2 away win against Leganés to keep his team two points clear of Barcelona with a game in hand. In spite of spending the vast majority of the season as backup to Benzema, he scored 15 league goals as the club was crowned champions for the first time in five years. He added three goals in nine appearances in the UEFA Champions League, which Real Madrid won for the second successive year.

Chelsea

2017–18 season

On 19 July 2017, Chelsea announced that they had agreed terms with Real Madrid for the transfer of Morata, for a reported club-record fee of around £60 million. On 21 July, he successfully passed his medical and officially became a Chelsea player.

Morata made his competitive debut in the 2017 FA Community Shield match against Arsenal, coming on as a substitute in the 74th minute as his team lost on penalties after drawing 1–1 in normal time, with Morata missing in the shoot-out. On 12 August 2017, he scored and provided an assist for David Luiz in his first appearance in the Premier League, a 2–3 defeat at home to Burnley – his goal was a header in the 69th minute of the game to cut the deficit to 3–1. On 23 September, he scored his first hat-trick for Chelsea in a 4–0 away win against Stoke City; this made him the 17th Chelsea player to score a hat-trick in the Premier League.

On 5 November 2017, Morata scored in the 1–0 home defeat of Manchester United, coached by his former boss Mourinho. He took his league tally to ten goals on 26 December, helping Chelsea to a 2–0 win over Brighton & Hove Albion, also at Stamford Bridge.

On 17 January 2018, Morata was sent off after picking up a booking for diving, then another seconds later for dissent, in a third round FA Cup replay win over Norwich City. He finished his first year with 15 goals in all competitions, and the Blues finished fifth in the league table.

2018–19 season
Morata opened his account for the following campaign on 18 August 2018, scoring the second goal in a 3–2 home victory against Arsenal. On 4 October, he scored the winner in a 1–0 win over MOL Vidi in the group stage of the UEFA Europa League. A month later, he scored twice to help beat Crystal Palace 3–1 in a league fixture at home.

Atlético Madrid

2018–19 season

On 27 January 2019, Morata returned to Atlético Madrid after 12 years, joining the club on an 18-month loan deal. He made his league debut on 3 February, in a 0–1 away loss against Real Betis. He scored his first goal on 24 February, in a 2–0 home win over Villarreal.

On 6 July 2019, Atlético Madrid confirmed the permanent signing of Morata from Chelsea and he would officially join the club on 1 July 2020, for a fee around £58 million.

2019–20 season
On 18 August 2019, Morata scored the only goal in Atlético Madrid's La Liga opener win against Getafe. On 1 October 2019, Morata marked his 300th professional game with an assist for the game's opening goal in a 2–0 away win against Russian side Lokomotiv Moscow. On 22 October, he scored his first Champions League goal for Atlético by heading home Renan Lodi's cross for the only goal of the game in a 1–0 win at home against German side Bayer Leverkusen. This also made him the first player to score for both Real Madrid and Atlético in the Champions League. On 11 March 2020, in the Champions League last 16 second leg away to defending champions Liverpool, Morata came on as a late substitute in extra time and scored the final goal of the game in a 3–2 away win, thus winning the tie 4–2 on aggregate, ensuring his team's qualification to the quarter-finals of the competition.

Return to Juventus

2020–21 season
Morata returned to Juventus on 22 September 2020, on a one-year loan worth €10 million, with an option for purchase at €45 million. Juventus also reserve the right to extend the loan for a further year for another €10 million; in this case, the option for purchase is worth €35 million. He made his first appearance for the club since his return on 27 September, in a 2–2 away draw against Roma in Serie A. He scored his first goal for the club since his return on 17 October, in a 1–1 away draw to Crotone. Morata scored a brace on 20 October, to help Juventus win 2–0 in the UEFA Champions League group stage match against Dynamo Kyiv away from home. On 28 October, he had three goals disallowed for offside against Barcelona in a Champions League group stage game, which Juventus lost 2–0 at home. On 20 January 2021, Morata won the Supercoppa Italiana, beating 2–0 Napoli in a match where he scored the second goal.

On 15 June 2021, Morata's loan with Juventus was extended until 30 June 2022.

Back to Atletico Madrid
In July 2022, Atlético Madrid confirmed that Morata will return to Madrid at the end of his loan spell at Juventus. On Feb 22, 2023, he said fans who chanted racist insults should be banned for life, in light of multiple incidents of racism against players in the Spanish top flight. "It's unacceptable and inexplicable. It should never have a place in football," he told ESPN.

International career

Youth

Morata was selected to the Spain under-17 team for the 2009 U-17 World Cup in Nigeria, playing four matches and scoring two goals as Spain finished third. Subsequently, he represented the under-19s at the Japan International Tournament, helping Spain finish second behind the hosts.

Morata was selected by Spain for the 2011 UEFA European Under-19 Championship in Romania, helping the national team win the tournament with six goals, the highest in the competition. He made his debut with the under-21s at the 2013 UEFA European Under-21 Championship in Israel, scoring the only goal in each of the first two group games against Russia and Germany, in the 82nd and 86th minutes respectively. He closed out a perfect group stage with his third goal, against the Netherlands in a 3–0 win. Spain won the tournament, and he finished as the competition's top scorer.

Senior
On 7 November 2014, Morata was called up to manager Vicente del Bosque's senior squad for matches against Belarus and Germany. He made his debut against Belarus on the 15th, replacing Isco for the last ten minutes of a 3–0 win in Huelva for the UEFA Euro 2016 qualifiers. In the same competition, on 27 March 2015, he scored his first senior international goal, the only goal in a victory over Ukraine in Seville.

Selected for the finals in France, Morata started and scored a brace in a 3–0 group win against Turkey in Nice. On 2 September 2017, coming off the bench in the 77th minute, he scored once to help the hosts defeat Italy 3–0 in the 2018 FIFA World Cup qualifiers.

On 21 May 2018, Morata was left out of Spain's 23-man squad for the World Cup finals, following what was described by The Guardian as "an indifferent season at Chelsea."

On 24 May 2021, he was included in Luis Enrique's 24-man squad for UEFA Euro 2020. On 19 June, In Spain's second group match of the tournament against Poland, Morata scored the opening goal in an eventual 1–1 draw. Morata scored Spain's fourth goal of the Euro 2020 round of 16 in the 100th minute of the game against Croatia, resulting in a 5–3 victory on 28 June. In the semi-finals against Italy, he came off the bench to score an equalising goal, which sent the match to extra-time and eventually to a penalty-shootout. Spain was eliminated after losing the shootout by 4–2, in which his penalty was saved by Gianluigi Donnarumma. However, his goal against Italy was his sixth in the European Championship, allowing him to become Spain's top scorer in the competition, overtaking Fernando Torres' former record of five goals in the competition.

In November 2022, he was named in the final squad for the 2022 FIFA World Cup in Qatar. During the group stage, he scored a goal each in all three matches against Costa Rica, Germany and Japan, eqauling the same record for Spain by Telmo Zarra in 1950.

Style of play
In his younger days, Morata was compared to Real Madrid and Spain's Fernando Morientes due to his playing style. During his first season at Juventus he stood out for his pace, energy, physicality and work-rate on the pitch, while his technique, opportunism, heading ability and positional sense saw him score several crucial goals.

A versatile and well-rounded forward, Morata is capable of playing as a main striker or linking up play between the lines, and has also played out wide on the wing.

Personal life
Morata was born in Madrid. He is son to Susana Martín and Alfonso Morata. His father is heavily involved in transfer negotiations alongside Morata's agent, Juanma López.

In March 2014, Morata shaved off all of his hair in solidarity with sick children, saying "kids with cancer wanted to have my haircut but they couldn't, so I gave myself theirs."

On 10 December 2016, he got engaged to his Italian girlfriend Alice Campello and married in Venice on 17 June 2017. Their twin sons Alessandro and Leonardo were born on 29 July 2018 and Morata changed his kit number at Chelsea from 9 to 29 to honour them. On 29 September 2020, the couple's third son Edoardo was born. On 9 January 2023, the couple's first daughter Bella
was born.

Career statistics

Club

International

Spain score listed first, score column indicates score after each Morata goal.

Honours
Real Madrid Castilla
 Segunda División B: 2011–12

Real Madrid
 La Liga: 2011–12, 2016–17
 Copa del Rey: 2010–11, 2013–14
 UEFA Champions League: 2013–14, 2016–17
 UEFA Super Cup: 2016
 FIFA Club World Cup: 2016

Juventus
 Serie A: 2014–15, 2015–16
 Coppa Italia: 2014–15, 2015–16, 2020–21; runner-up: 2021–22
 Supercoppa Italiana: 2020
 UEFA Champions League runner-up: 2014–15

Chelsea
 FA Cup: 2017–18
 UEFA Europa League: 2018–19

Spain U17
 FIFA U-17 World Cup third place: 2009

Spain U19
 UEFA European Under-19 Championship: 2011

Spain U21
 UEFA European Under-21 Championship: 2013

Individual
 UEFA European Under-19 Championship Team of the Tournament: 2011
 UEFA European Under-19 Championship Golden Boot: 2011
 UEFA European Under-21 Championship Team of the Tournament: 2013
 UEFA European Under-21 Championship Golden Boot: 2013
 UEFA Champions League Squad of the Season: 2014–15

References

External links

Atlético Madrid official profile 

1992 births
Living people
Footballers from Madrid
Spanish footballers
Association football forwards
Real Madrid Castilla footballers
Real Madrid CF players
Atlético Madrid footballers
Juventus F.C. players
Chelsea F.C. players
Segunda División B players
Segunda División players
La Liga players
Serie A players
Premier League players
UEFA Champions League winning players
Spain youth international footballers
Spain under-21 international footballers
Spain international footballers
UEFA Euro 2016 players
UEFA Euro 2020 players
2022 FIFA World Cup players
Spanish expatriate footballers
Expatriate footballers in Italy
Expatriate footballers in England
Spanish expatriate sportspeople in Italy
Spanish expatriate sportspeople in England
FA Cup Final players